Daffy Duck's Fantastic Island (also known as Daffy Duck's Movie: Fantastic Island) is a 1983 Looney Tunes traditionally animated compilation film directed by Friz Freleng and Phil Monroe with a compilation of classic Warner Bros. cartoon shorts and animated bridging sequences, hosted by Daffy Duck and Speedy Gonzales. This was the first Looney Tunes compilation film to center on Daffy Duck, as the previous ones had centered on Bugs Bunny.

A note in the end credits dedicates the film to animator and story man, John Dunn, "who inspired it." Dunn died of heart failure in San Fernando, California on January 17, 1983; six months before the film's release.

Plot
The premise of the framing animation was a general parody of the popular 1970s/1980s television series Fantasy Island, with Daffy Duck and Speedy Gonzales playing caricatures of that series' principal characters, Mr. Roarke and Tattoo (respectively). 
                 
The pair, stranded on a desert island for months with nothing on it but a coconut tree (and Daffy sick and tired of eating and drinking coconuts), discover a treasure map which leads them to a magical, talking wishing well. The greedy Daffy proposes to use the power of the well, which obeys the commands of whoever holds the map. Rather than simply wishing for a heap of wealth, Daffy figures that he can make himself and Speedy rich by transforming the barren island into a verdant tourist paradise and selling other people wishes for a hefty fee. Speedy and Daffy attire themselves in the white suits worn by Tattoo and Roarke in the television show, with Speedy exclaiming "da plane, da plane" as an airplane carrying various Looney Tunes characters arrives on the island. As the customers step up for their chance at the well, their wishes are fulfilled through the events of a classic Looney Tunes cartoon.
                   
Meanwhile, Yosemite Sam, cast as a pirate, and his first mate, the Tasmanian Devil, search for the map, which originally belonged to them (they had earlier lost their ship in a battle with Bugs Bunny). They eventually find out that Daffy took it (the two pirates had a single black feather for a clue). In their pursuit of Daffy and Speedy, Sam inadvertently chases the former up a mountain and, when they lose their grip on the map, onto a volcanic field. The map is lost to all because of this, causing the island to revert to its original state and Daffy, Speedy, Sam, and Taz end up trapped on the once-again-deserted island. The well gives them three wishes individually, but warns them to use them wisely for they are the last wishes it will ever grant. After Daffy and Speedy waste their wishes -Speedy wishing for a burrito, then Daffy angrily responding by wishing the burrito to be stuck on the end of Speedy's nose- Daffy asks Sam to wish the burrito off Speedy's nose, but discovers that Sam already wished for a ship, abandoning Daffy and telling them after he sinks Bugs, he'll come back and pick up the pair. Daffy (now furious) then shouts his catchphrase "You're despicable!" at Sam and Taz. The film concludes with the wishing well doing the famed "That's all, folks!" sign-off.

Classic cartoons in order
The following includes the Well's descriptions of each cartoon (except for the first one) in relation to that character's wish. Some cartoons are abridged.

 Captain Hareblower (Pirate Sam vs. Bugs Bunny, shortened)
 Stupor Duck (Daffy's wish): "Your fondest wish, your fondest dream... ...I'll make you superduck supreme!"
 Greedy for Tweety (Granny's wish, slightly extended): "Your wish shall be granted. Gaze into me and see. The next time that you see yourself... a nurse is what you'll be!"
 Banty Raids (Foghorn Leghorn's wish, shortened): "I am here to grant your wish, the spirit of the well. I will knock the cockiness out of that little cockerel." After this one, Foghorn, believing he was hornswoggled, demands a refund, but gets another penny.
 Louvre Come Back to Me! (Pepé Le Pew's wish, shortened): "I grant your wish to meet a girl of beauty unsurpassed... which when compared with works of art... ...will leave the Louvre outclassed."
 Tree for Two (Spike & Chester's wish): "If that's his wish and yours alike... ...I'll make Chester brave and strong, like Spike."
 Curtain Razor (Porky Pig's wish, shortened with altered opening): "Discovering new talent for the world to see... ...a wondrous thing for a producer to be."
 A Mouse Divided (Sylvester's wife's wish, the opening with the drunken stork is omitted and the ending was changed to occur on the island): Sylvester's wife: "Wishing well, O wishing well... ...you I do entreat. I wish our house would resound to... ...the patter of little feet." The Well: "I hear your wish and I obey. The patter of little feet you shall hear this day."
 Of Rice and Hen & Lovelorn Leghorn (Prissy's wish, with the opening of the former and the plot of the latter): "Your mind is such a simple thing... ...your wish I can foretell. You're wishing for a husband, and the ring of a wedding bell"
 From Hare to Heir (Pirate Sam's wish): The Well: "A very rich relative in poor health... ...doth will to you his entire wealth."

Voice cast
 Mel Blanc as Daffy Duck, Speedy Gonzales, Yosemite Sam, Bugs Bunny, Tasmanian Devil, Foghorn Leghorn, Pepé Le Pew, Spike, Porky Pig, Sylvester, Tweety, and Crows.
 June Foray as Granny, Mrs. Sylvester, and Miss Prissy.
 Les Tremayne as Wishing Well.

Merchandise
In 1981, a puzzle showing 105 Looney Tunes characters was issued. Among the characters there are three that never appeared in animation, identified as Hoppy, Hysterical Hyram and Minniesoda Fats. In one scene in Daffy Duck's Fantastic Island Hoppy and Hysterical Hyram are seen waiting for their chance to make their dreams come true (along with two other unidentified characters, namely a white dog and a small mouse with a hat). It is their only known appearance in animation.

Home media
The film was released on DVD exclusively through Wal-Mart on August 12, 2014 and by Warner Home Video on November 18, 2014.  It is also available as a download from the iTunes Store. It finally saw a UK DVD release on July 5, 2021.

See also
List of animated feature films of 1983
List of animated package films

References

External links

 
 
 

1983 films
1983 comedy films
1983 animated films
1980s American animated films
1980s children's adventure films
1980s children's comedy films
1980s children's fantasy films
1980s children's animated films
1980s adventure comedy films
1980s fantasy comedy films
1980s English-language films
American children's animated adventure films
American children's animated comedy films
American children's animated fantasy films
American adventure comedy films
American fantasy comedy films
Surreal comedy films
Animated anthology films
Looney Tunes films
Bugs Bunny films
Daffy Duck films
Foghorn Leghorn films
Pepé Le Pew films
Porky Pig films
Speedy Gonzales films
Sylvester the Cat films
Tasmanian Devil (Looney Tunes) films
Tweety films
Yosemite Sam films
Pirate films
Talking animals in fiction
Films about wish fulfillment
Animated films set on islands
Films set in 1983
Films directed by Friz Freleng
Films scored by Eugene Poddany
Films scored by Robert J. Walsh
Warner Bros. films
Warner Bros. animated films
Warner Bros. Animation animated films